Dmitriyevskoye is a rural locality (a village) in Novlenskoye Rural Settlement, Vologodsky District, Vologda Oblast, Russia. The population was 17 as of 2002.

Geography 
The distance to Vologda is 62 km, to Novlenskoye is 2 km. Kolotilovo, Novlenskoye, Maryinskoye, Andryushino are the nearest rural localities.

References 

Rural localities in Vologodsky District